Anna "Ans" van Dijk (24 December 1905 – 14 January 1948) was a Dutch collaborator who betrayed Jews to Nazi Germany during World War II. She was the only Dutch woman to be executed for her wartime activities.

Biography 
Born in Amsterdam, Ans van Dijk was the daughter of Jewish parents Aron van Dijk and Kaatje Bin. She married Bram Querido in 1927, and they separated in 1935. After the marriage ended, she began a lesbian relationship with a woman named Miep Stodel, and opened a millinery shop called Maison Evany in Amsterdam. The shop was closed by the Nazis in 1941 as part of their seizure of Jewish property—Jews were forbidden to own businesses or work in retail shops, amongst other occupational restrictions. Stodel fled to Switzerland in 1942.

Van Dijk was arrested on Easter Sunday 1943 by the Sicherheitsdienst (SD; the Nazi intelligence service) detective Peter Schaap of the Office of Jewish Affairs of the Amsterdam police. After promising to work for the SD, van Dijk was released. Pretending to be a member of the resistance, she offered to help Jews find hiding places and obtain false papers. In this way, she trapped at least 145 people, including her own brother and his family. Some 85 of her victims later died in concentration camps. She may have been responsible for the deaths of as many as 700 people. It has been suggested that she may have betrayed Anne Frank and her family.

After the war, she moved to The Hague, where she was arrested at a friend's home on 20 June 1945, and charged with 23 counts of treason. On 24 February 1947, she was brought to the Special Court in Amsterdam. She confessed on all counts, explaining that she only acted out of self-preservation, and was sentenced to death. However, her superior, Willy Lages, had previously described van Dijk as eager to do her job, for which she was paid for every person she helped find. She appealed the conviction, but in September 1947 the Special Court of Appeals confirmed her punishment. Her request for a royal pardon was also rejected.

The night before her execution she was baptized and joined the Roman Catholic Church.

References

Further reading 
 
 

1905 births
1948 deaths
Criminals from Amsterdam
Dutch Jews
Dutch Roman Catholics
Lesbian Jews
Dutch lesbians
Jewish collaborators with Nazi Germany
Holocaust perpetrators in the Netherlands
Executed Dutch women
Executed Dutch collaborators with Nazi Germany
People executed by the Netherlands by firing squad
Converts to Roman Catholicism from Judaism
20th-century Dutch women
20th-century Dutch LGBT people
Executed mass murderers